Gwillim Lake Provincial Park is a provincial park in British Columbia, Canada.

External links
Gwillim Lake as featured on DiscoverThePeaceCountry.com
BC Geographical Names: Gwillim Lake Park

Peace River Regional District
Provincial parks of British Columbia
Year of establishment missing